Eta Elizabeth Banda (born 1949) is a former Malawian politician who was the country's Minister of Foreign Affairs from 2009 to 2011. Prior to entering politics, she worked as a health professional and university administrator.

Early life
Banda studied at Malawi's college of nursing and then worked in that profession for some time. She subsequently pursued further study, initially in South Africa and then in the United States, where she graduated with a Master of Science (M.Sc.) degree in community health nursing from Boston University. She later went on to complete a doctorate at the University of Maryland, in the fields of nursing administration, education, and policy. On her return to Malawi, Banda became a member of the faculty of the Kamuzu College of Nursing in Lilongwe, which is part of the University of Malawi. Her research focused on health policy planning in Malawi and the wider Southern Africa region, and she served on the editorial board of the African Journal of Midwifery. She was eventually appointed dean of the college, and later served as vice-principal and principal.

Politics
Banda was elected to the National Assembly of Malawi at the 2009 general election, standing for the Democratic Progressive Party (DPP) in the Nkhata Bay South constituency. When President Bingu wa Mutharika formed his new cabinet in June 2009, she was made Minister of Foreign Affairs. She became the third woman to hold the position, after Lilian Patel and Joyce Banda. In April 2011, Banda had Fergus Cochrane-Dyet, the High Commissioner of the United Kingdom to Malawi, expelled from the country, after a diplomatic telegram was leaked in which he criticised President wa Mutharika. Her decision to do so was made with the president's knowledge, but he gave her his retrospective approval when she made remarks to the effect that she would rather resign as foreign minister than see her president insulted with impunity. In August 2011, however, President wa Mutharika decided to sack his entire cabinet. When it was reconstituted the following month on 7 September 2011, Banda was omitted. Since December 2012 Banda has lived overseas in the UK where she holds a senior role with an educational charity.

See also
 List of female foreign ministers

References

1949 births
Living people
Boston University School of Nursing alumni
Democratic Progressive Party (Malawi) politicians
Female foreign ministers
Foreign Ministers of Malawi
Malawian expatriates in the United States
Malawian nurses
Women government ministers of Malawi
Members of the National Assembly (Malawi)
Nursing researchers
Nursing school deans
Academic staff of the University of Malawi
University System of Maryland alumni
21st-century women politicians
Malawian women diplomats
Malawian expatriates in South Africa